Adolfo Gonzales Chaves is a partido of Buenos Aires Province in Argentina, it is located at coordinates .

The provincial subdivision has a population of 12,496 inhabitants in an area of 3,780 km² (1,459 sq mi), and its capital city is Adolfo Gonzales Chaves, which is located around 470 km (292 mi) from Buenos Aires.

The province was founded on August 22, 1916, and the people are known as chavense.

Economy
The economy of Adolfo Gonzales Chaves Partido is dominated by agriculture. The main agricultural products of the district are; wheat, maize, sunflowers, barley oats, linseed and sorghum. Other industries include traditional rural work such as carpenters, masons and blacksmiths.

Towns
 Adolfo Gonzales Chaves (pop 8,613)
 Álzaga
 De La Garma (pop 1,801)
 Juan Eulogio Barra (pop 252)
 Pedro Próspero Lasalle
 Vasquez (pop 35)

External links

 
 Ministry of the Interior statistics

Partidos of Buenos Aires Province